Cytisus scoparius (syn. Sarothamnus scoparius), the common broom or Scotch broom, is a deciduous leguminous shrub native to western and central Europe. In Britain and Ireland, the standard name is broom; this name is also used for other members of the Genisteae tribe, such as French broom or Spanish broom; and the term common broom is sometimes used for clarification. In other English-speaking countries, the most common name is "Scotch broom" (or Scots broom); however, it is known as English broom in Australia.

Description 

Stems are ridged and green. Flowering occurs after 50–80 growing degree days. The seed pods have long hairs only along their seams. This species is adapted to Mediterranean and coastal climates, and its range is limited by cold winter temperatures. Especially the seeds, seedlings, and young shoots are sensitive to frost; adult plants are hardier, and branches affected by freezing temperatures regenerate quickly. C. scoparius contains toxic alkaloids that depress the heart and nervous system.

As a legume, this shrub can fix nitrogen in the soil through a symbiotic relationship with Rhizobium bacteria.

Phytochemicals 
One of main alkaloids of this plant is cytisine. The characteristic constituents are biogenic amines (mostly tyramine in the young shoots), flavonoids (spiraeoside and scoparoside), isoflavones and their glycosides (genistin), as well as allelopathic quinolizidine alkaloids (mostly sparteine, lupanine, scoparin and hydroxy-derivatives), which defend the plant against insect infestation and herbivory (with the exception of the resistant Aphis cytisorum).

Classification 
The two subspecies of Cytisus scoparius are: 
 Cytisus scoparius subsp. scoparius - throughout the species' range
 Cytisus scoparius subsp. maritimus (Rouy) Heywood - Western Europe, on maritime cliffs, differs in prostrate growth, not over 0.4 m tall, and downy young shoots

Distribution and habitat
Cytisus scoparius is native to western and central Europe, being common in Great Britain and Ireland. It is found in sunny sites, usually on dry, sandy soils at low altitudes, tolerating very acidic soil conditions.

Outside of its native range, it is an ecologically destructive colonizing invasive species in grassland, shrub and woodland, and other habitats.

Ecology

As an invasive species 

Cytisus scoparius has been introduced into several other continents outside its native range and is classified as a noxious invasive species in western North America, including British Columbia (including Vancouver Island), California, Oregon, and Washington west of the Cascade and Sierra Nevada mountains,  parts of North America's east coast, as well as Australia (where it is a declared weed), New Zealand, and India. These shrubs commonly grow in disturbed areas and along utility and transportation rights-of-way. The prolific growth of this species after timber harvest inhibits reforestation by competing with seedling trees. It is estimated that it is responsible for US$47 million in lost timber production each year in Oregon. In New Zealand, broom is estimated to cost the forestry industry NZ$90 million, and to cost farmers NZ$10 million.

Biological control for broom has been investigated since the mid-1980s with a number of species being tested. They include the broom twig miner (Leucoptera spartifoliella), the broom seed beetle (Bruchidius villosus), the broom gall mite (Aceria genistae), the sap-sucking broom psyllid (Arytainilla spartiophila), the Scotch broom seed weevil  (Exapion fuscirostre) and recently the broom leaf beetle (Gonioctena olivacea) and the broom shoot moth (Agonopterix assimilella).

Eradication 
The method used to remove broom is dependent on the prolific seed cycle. Care should be taken to avoid disturbing the ground or the seeding plants between late spring and mid fall. From late fall, through winter, to mid spring are preferred times to eradicate mature plants. There are several methods, cutting, pulling, burning, herbicide or introducing chickens and goats. Drought areas respond well to cutting while the seed pods are young and still green. In cooler, wetter areas pulling is the preferred method, and hand-operated broom pullers are available. Low temperature fires, such as a grass fire, will increase seed germination and new sprouts may form on the burned stumps of mature broom. A spring fire followed by drought conditions will reduce seedling survival. Often new plants will grow from roots or seed, requiring repeated treatments.

Cultivation 
Cytisus scoparius is widely cultivated as an ornamental plant, with several cultivars selected for variation in flower colour, including "Moonlight" with deep yellow flowers, "Andreanus" and "Firefly" with dark orange-red flowers, and growth habit, including "Pendula" with pendulous branchlets.

Uses 
Broom contains scoparin, which is a diuretic. The plant also is used as a cathartic and as a cardiac stimulant, which is credited to the presence of sparteine. A decoction or infusion of broom can be used to treat dropsy due to its diuretic action. An ointment can be made from the flowers to treat gout. Oxysparteine, produced from the action of acid on the sparteine, is useful as a cardiac stimulant and has the advantage over digoxin that it does not accumulate in the body.

Culture
In Welsh mythology, Blodeuwedd is the name of a woman made from the flowers of broom, meadowsweet (Filipendula ulmaria) and the oak by Math fab Mathonwy and Gwydion to be the wife of Lleu Llaw Gyffes. Her story is part of the Fourth Branch of the Mabinogi, the tale of Math son of Mathonwy.

Broom was considered a sign of plenty when it bore many flowers.<ref name="A Modern Herbal p126">A Modern Herbal, Grieve, Maude, p. 126</ref> However a traditional rhyme from Sussex warns: "Sweep the house with blossomed broom in May/sweep the head of the household away." Broom was also used in a decorated bundle of broom at weddings in place of rosemary when that was scarce, and its strong smell was said to be able to tame wild horses and dogs.

In Italy, the shrub was burnt with the intent of stopping witches.

 Royal symbols 
The name of the House of Plantagenet, rulers of England in the Middle Ages, may have been derived from common broom, which was then known as planta genista in Latin. The plant was used as a heraldic badge by Geoffrey V of Anjou and five Plantagenet kings of England as a royal emblem. The broomscod'', or seed-pod, was the personal emblem of Charles VI of France.

See also 
 Broom of the Cowdenknowes

References

Further reading

External links

 Bioimages – numerous photos
 Garry Oak ecosystems: Invasive species
Species Profile - Scotch Broom(Cytisus scoparius), National Invasive Species Information Center, United States National Agricultural Library.

scoparius
Flora of Europe
Flora of Scotland
Flora of Ireland
Plants described in 1753
Taxa named by Carl Linnaeus